Each national team will submit a squad of 23 players for UEFA Women's Euro 2022, three of whom must be goalkeepers. If a player is injured or ill severely enough to prevent their participation in the tournament before the team's first match, they can be replaced by another player. The squad list must be published no later than 10 days before the tournament's opening match.

The age listed for each player is their age as of 6 July 2022, the first day of the tournament. The numbers of caps and goals listed for each player do not include any matches played after the start of the tournament. The club listed is the club for which the player last played a competitive match prior to the tournament. The nationality for each club reflects the national association (not the league) to which the club is affiliated. A flag is included for coaches who are of a different nationality to their team.

Group A

Austria
The squad was announced on 27 June 2022. On 4 July, Virginia Kirchberger replaced Lisa Kolb who withdrew after contracting to COVID-19 and Annabel Schasching replaced Maria Plattner who withdrew following a shoulder injury sustained in training.

Head coach: Irene Fuhrmann

England
A provisional 28-player squad was announced on 17 May 2022. The final squad was announced on 15 June 2022.

Head coach:  Sarina Wiegman

Northern Ireland
The squad was announced on 27 June 2022.

Head coach: Kenny Shiels

Norway
The squad was announced on 7 June 2022. On 26 June, Thea Bjelde replaced Lisa Naalsund, who withdrew following a leg injury suffered in a friendly against New Zealand.

Head coach:  Martin Sjögren

Group B

Denmark
The squad was announced on 16 June 2022.

Head coach: Lars Søndergaard

Finland
The squad was announced on 9 June 2022.

Head coach:  Anna Signeul

Germany
A provisional 28-player squad was announced on 31 May 2022. The final squad was announced on 18 June 2022.

Head coach: Martina Voss-Tecklenburg

Spain
A provisional 28-player squad was announced on 31 May 2022. The final squad was announced on 27 June 2022. On 29 June, Teresa Abelleira replaced Salma Paralluelo who withdrew following a muscle injury. On 5 July, Amaiur Sarriegi replaced Alexia Putellas who withdrew following an ACL injury suffered in training.

Head coach: Jorge Vilda

Group C

Netherlands
The squad was announced on 31 May 2022. On 11 July, Jacintha Weimar replaced Sari van Veenendaal who withdrew after first match vs Sweden following an injury.

Head coach:  Mark Parsons

Portugal
The squad was announced on 30 May 2022. On 17 June, Lúcia Alves replaced Mariana Azevedo who withdrew following a knee ligament injury sustained in training. On 5 July, Suzane Pires replaced Andreia Jacinto who withdrew following an injury.

Head coach: Francisco Neto

Sweden
The squad was announced on 7 June 2022.

Head coach: Peter Gerhardsson

Switzerland
The squad was announced on 21 June 2022. On 27 June, Nadine Riesen replaced Ella Touon (not to be confused with England's Ella Toone), who withdrew following a high ankle sprain sustained in training.

Head coach:  Nils Nielsen

Group D

Belgium
A provisional 33-player squad was announced on 16 May 2022. The final squad was announced on 20 June 2022.

Head coach: Ives Serneels

France
The squad was announced on 30 May 2022.

Head coach: Corinne Diacre

Iceland
The squad was announced on 11 June 2022. On 9 July, Auður Sveinbjörnsdóttir Scheving replaced Cecilía Rán Rúnarsdóttir, who withdrew following a finger injury suffered in training. On 14 July, Íris Dögg Gunnarsdóttir replaced Telma Ívarsdóttir, who suffered an injury in training the previous day.

Head coach: Þorsteinn Halldórsson

Italy
The squad was announced on 26 June 2022.

Head coach: Milena Bertolini

Player representation

Players
Oldest (goalkeeper):  Hedvig Lindahl
Oldest (outfield):  Caroline Seger
Youngest (goalkeeper):  Cecilía Rán Rúnarsdóttir
Youngest (outfield):  Amanda Andradóttir

By club
Clubs with 3 or more players represented are listed.

By club nationality

By club federation

References

External links

Squads
2022